The Gospel of the Hebrews, or Gospel according to the Hebrews, is a lost Jewish–Christian gospel. The text of the gospel is lost, with only fragments of it surviving as brief quotations by the early Church Fathers and in apocryphal writings. The fragments contain traditions of Jesus' pre-existence, incarnation, baptism, and probably of his temptation, along with some of his sayings. Distinctive features include a Christology characterized by the belief that the Holy Spirit is Jesus' Divine Mother and a first resurrection appearance to James, the brother of Jesus, showing a high regard for James as the leader of the Jewish Christian church in Jerusalem. It was probably composed in Greek in the first decades of the 2nd century, and is believed to have been used by Greek-speaking Jewish Christians in Egypt during that century.

The Gospel of the Hebrews is the only Jewish–Christian gospel which the Church Fathers referred to by name, believing there was only one Hebrew Gospel, perhaps in different versions. This has created confusion as modern scholars believe that the Church Fathers were in reality quoting three different gospels. All are known today only from fragments preserved in quotations by the early Church Fathers. Modern scholars have given these three different gospels the working name Gospel of the Hebrews, the Gospel of the Nazarenes and the Gospel of the Ebionites.

Passages from the gospel of the Hebrews were quoted or summarized by three Alexandrian Fathers – Clement, Origen and Didymus the Blind; it was also quoted by Jerome, either directly or through the commentaries of Origen. The Gospel did not contain the genealogical records or the virgin birth narrative now appended to the Greek gospels.

The gospel was used as a supplement to the canonical gospels to provide source material for their commentaries based on scripture. Eusebius included it in his list of disputed writings known as the Antilegomena, noting that it was used by "Hebrews" within the Church; it fell out of use when the New Testament canon was codified at the end of the 4th century.

Origin and characteristics 
The Gospel of the Hebrews, as known to scholars, is thought to have been composed in Greek. The provenance has been associated with Egypt; it probably began circulating in Alexandria, Egypt, in the first decades of the 2nd century and was used by Greek-speaking Jewish–Christian communities there. The communities to which they belonged were traditional, conservative Christians who followed the teaching of the primitive Christian church in Jerusalem, integrating their understanding of Jesus with strict observance of Jewish customs and law, which they regarded as essential to salvation. Despite this, the gospel displays no connection with other Jewish–Christian literature, nor does it appear to be based on the Greek rendition of the Gospel of Matthew or the other canonical gospels of what is now orthodox Christianity. Instead, it seems to be taken from alternative oral forms of the same underlying traditions. Some of the fragments suggest a syncretic gnostic influence, while others support close ties to traditional Jewish Wisdom literature.

Content 

The Gospel of the Hebrews is preserved in fragments quoted or summarized by various early Church Fathers. The full extent of the original gospel is unknown; according to a list of canonical and apocryphal works drawn up in the 9th century, known as the Stichometry of Nicephorus, the gospel was 2,200 lines, just 300 lines shorter than Matthew. Based on the surviving fragments, the overall structure of the gospel appears to have been similar to the canonical ones. It consisted of a narrative of the life of Jesus which included his baptism, temptation, transfiguration, Last Supper, crucifixion, and resurrection. The gospel also contained sayings of Jesus. The events in the life of Jesus have been interpreted in a way that reflects Jewish ideas present in a Hellenistic cultural environment.

There is wide agreement about seven quotations cited by Philipp Vielhauer in the critical 3rd German edition of Wilhelm Schneemelcher's New Testament Apocrypha, translated by George Ogg. The translations below follow Vielhauer's order:

Fragment 1 identifies Jesus as the son of the Holy Spirit; this idea is found also in the Egyptian Coptic Epistle of James, another indication of the Egyptian origin of the gospel.

Fragment 2 uses the language of Jewish Wisdom literature, but applies it to the Holy Spirit: the Spirit has waited through all the prophets for the Son. The "rest" that the Holy Spirit finds in the Son may belongs to the Christian gnostic idea of the pre-existent Redeemer who finally becomes incarnate in Jesus.

Fragments 2 and 3, giving accounts of Jesus' baptism and temptation or transfiguration, spring from the widespread Greco-Roman myth of the descent of divine Wisdom; this underlies the parallel passages in the gospels of Matthew (11:25–30), Luke (7:18–35 and 11:49–51) and John (1:1–18), as well as the Gospel of Thomas. The differences between fragment 3 and the orthodox canonical gospels are considerable: their third-person narrative has become an account by Jesus himself, Satan is replaced by the Holy Spirit, and the Holy Spirit is identified as Jesus' mother.

Fragment 4 is a "chain-saying", seek–find–marvel–reign–rest, describing the steps towards salvation, where "rest" equals the state of salvation. The saying is similar to themes found in Jewish Wisdom literature, and the similarity to a saying in the Gospel of Thomas suggests that the text may have been influenced by gnostic Wisdom teaching.

Fragments 5 (on Ephesians 5.4) and 6 (on Ezekiel 18.7) are ethical sayings of Jesus, suggesting that such teachings formed a significant part of the gospel.

Fragment 7 emphasizes the importance of James, the brother of Jesus and head of the Jewish–Christian movement in Jerusalem after Jesus' death, thereby testifying to the Jewish character of the community of the gospel.

In addition to direct quotations, other gospel stories were summarized or cited by the Church Fathers. The translations below are from Vielhauer & Strecker (1991), except "b2" which is from Klauck (2003):

The summary of a gospel passage identifies Mattias, (which is the Greek form of Matthew, from Hebrew Matityahu, meaning "gift of God") as the name of the tax-collector who was called to follow Jesus.

The citation by Eusebius of a story he found in the writings of Papias is believed to refer to an alternate version of the account in John's gospel of Jesus and the woman taken in adultery.

Although Didymus does not name his source, he found this independent tradition of the story of the sinful woman in a non-canonical gospel in Alexandria which may have been the Gospel of the Hebrews.

Christology 
The theology of the gospel is strongly influenced by Jewish–Christian wisdom teaching. The Holy Spirit is represented as a manifestation of Divine Wisdom who is called "Mother". The feminine aspect of the Spirit is an indication of Semitic influence on the language of the gospel. The Spirit takes Jesus to Mount Tabor by a single hair, echoing Old Testament themes in the stories of Ezekiel (Ezkiel 8:3) and Habbakuk (Dan. 14:36 LXX). The gospel emphasizes the fulfillment of the prophecy of Isaiah 11:2 in Jesus' baptism, but also adopts elements of Jewish Wisdom theology. The Spirit has been gathered in one place at the moment of Jesus' baptism, so that he has become the only Son of the Spirit in which he has found eternal "rest" and reigns forever. The "seek–find" and "rule–rest" language also comes from Jewish Wisdom tradition as stages on the way to salvation during which the believer is encouraged to emulate divine Wisdom.

The "rest" that the Holy Spirit waits for and finally finds in the Son is also found in Gnostic speculations. The wisdom chain-saying which describes the progression of seeking, marveling, and finding salvation, is similar to the Hermetic conception of salvation found in the Alexandrian . "Rest" is not only to be understood as the ultimate goal of the seeker after truth, which leads to salvation; it is also descriptive of a unity with the wisdom which lies at the heart of the Godhead. The "resting" of the Holy Spirit at the moment of Jesus' Baptism may also be understood in this timeless sense, as the union and rest of the pre-existent Son with his Father, in keeping with the Gnostic conception of "rest" as the highest gift of salvation.

Reception 

Eusebius listed the Gospel of the Hebrews in his Antilegomena as one of the disputed writings of the early Church. Despite this, the Church Fathers occasionally used it, with reservations, as a source to support their exegetical arguments. Eusebius reports that the 2nd century Church Father Hegesippus used the gospel as a source for writing his Hypomneumata ("Memoranda") in Rome (c. 175–180). The Alexandrian Fathers – Clement, Origen, and Didymus the Blind – relied directly on the gospel to provide prooftexts as a supplement to the canonical gospels. Clement quoted from the gospel as part of a discourse on divine Wisdom. Origen used it to compare differing views of the relationship between the Word and the Holy Spirit. Jerome claimed to have used the gospel as a prooftext, although he may have relied in part on excerpts from the commentaries of Origen. He quoted from it as a proof from prophecy based on Isaiah 11:2 to explain how Jesus was the fulfillment of messianic expectations. The Gospel of the Hebrews was excluded from the canon by the early Church with the closing of the New Testament canon at the end of the 4th century, and was no longer cited as a source in Church literature.

Subsequent to the closing of the canon, the gospel is mentioned in a homily "On the Virgin Mary" attributed to Cyril of Jerusalem in a collection of apocryphal stories believed to have been written in Coptic in the first half of the 6th century. The author (known to scholars as Pseudo-Cyril) refers to the Gospel of the Hebrews in a polemical dialogue between a monk and Cyril over the nature of Mary, whom the monk contends was a divine power sent from heaven. Cyril condemns the monk's teaching as a heresy, which the author attributes to Carpocrates, Satornilus, and Ebionites. Not all later mentions of the gospel were polemical; Bede, after listing some apocryphal gospels rejected by the Church, includes the Gospel of the Hebrews among the "ecclesiastical histories" and refers to its usage by Jerome.

Relationship to other texts 
The early Church Fathers believed there was only one Jewish–Christian gospel, perhaps in different versions; however, scholars have long recognized the possibility there were at least two or three. Jerome's references to a Gospel of the Hebrews, or variants of that name, are particularly problematic because it is unclear which gospel he is referring to as the source of his quotations. Hegesippus, Eusebius, and Jerome all used an Aramaic gospel, which Jerome referred to as the gospel used by a Jewish Christian sect known as the Nazarenes. The Gospel of the Nazarenes is the name adopted by scholars to describe the fragments of quotations believed to originate from an Aramaic gospel that was based on traditions similar to the Gospel of Matthew. A third gospel was known only to Epiphanius of Salamis, which he attributed to a second Jewish Christian group known as the Ebionites. Scholars have conventionally referred to seven fragments of a Greek gospel harmony preserved in quotations by Epiphanius as the Gospel of the Ebionites. The existence of three independent Jewish–Christian gospels with distinct characteristics has been regarded as an established consensus. However, that conclusion has recently been challenged with respect to the composition of the gospel known to the Nazarenes and its relationship to the Gospel of the Hebrews. Others suggest that these three titles may have been referring to one and the same book. The relationship between the Gospel of the Hebrews and the other Jewish–Christian gospels, as well as a hypothetical original Hebrew Gospel, is uncertain and has been an ongoing subject of scholarly investigation.

See also 
Gospel of the Nazarenes
Gospel of the Ebionites
List of Gospels
Jewish–Christian gospels

Notes

Citations

Bibliography 

 
 
 
 
 
 
 
 
 
 
 
 
 
 
 
 
 
 
 
 
 
 
  (6th German edition, translated by George Ogg)
 
 
  (3rd German edition, translated by George Ogg)
  (6th German edition, translated by George Ogg)

Further reading

External links

 Early Christian Writings – Gospel of the Hebrews

Hebrews
Lost apocrypha
2nd-century Christian texts
Antilegomena